Prunus myrtifolia, called the West Indies cherry or myrtle laurel cherry, is a New World species of shrubs in the family Rosaceae.

Description
Prunus myrtifolia is a spineless, evergreen tree up to 12 metres (40 feet) tall, not forming clumps nor hairs. The flowers are white, formed in elongated arrays of up to 30 flowers. The fruit is dark purple, almost black, and is spherical or egg-shaped.

Distribution 
It is native to the southeastern United States (Florida), southern Mexico, Central America, South America, and the West Indies.

Gallery

References

External links 

 

myrtifolia
Flora of Mexico
Flora of Florida
Flora of South America
Plants described in 1753
Taxa named by Carl Linnaeus